Malinda Florence Muriel Parker, MBE (1925 – 26 December 2018) was a Welsh international lawn and indoor bowler.

In 1985, Parker won a triples bronze medal at the 1985 World Outdoor Bowls Championship in Preston, Victoria, Melbourne, Australia with Rita Jones and Mair Jones. Three years later she won another bronze in the fours at the 1988 World Outdoor Bowls Championship at Auckland.

Parker was part of the fours team that won the gold medal at the 1986 Commonwealth Games in Edinburgh.

Parker made her International debut in 1970 and was a National Champion in 1972 and 1983. In 1980 she became President for the Welsh National Bowls Association, and she was awarded an MBE as part of the 2000 Birthday Honours.

Parker died in Powys on 26 December 2018.

References

1925 births
2018 deaths
Welsh female bowls players
Commonwealth Games medallists in lawn bowls
Commonwealth Games gold medallists for Wales
Bowls players at the 1986 Commonwealth Games
Medallists at the 1986 Commonwealth Games